The steam locomotive class k.u.k HB 578 was a tank engine operated by the Imperial and Royal Military Field Railway (k.u.k. Heeresfeldbahn) in Austria-Hungary.

In World War I, the Austrian Military Railway placed their order for additional locomotives with Henschel in Kassel, because the Austrian locomotive factories were working at full capacity. These 22 locomotives had typical Prussian features and were grouped into Class 578. After the war's end, 10 engines were left in Poland as PKP Class TKp101 and twelve with the BBÖ, which retained their classification and serial numbers and set them to work as shunters on the large Viennese railway stations.

In 1938, the Deutsche Reichsbahn classified them as 92.2101–2112. Seven Polish TKp101 also joined the DRG during the course of fighting in the Second World War and were numbered 92.2113–2119.

After the end of the war, eight engines were left with the ÖBB, which were classified as ÖBB Class 292 and retained their serial numbers. They were retired by 1966.

See also 
 Deutsche Reichsbahn
 List of DRG locomotives and railbuses

References 
 
 

Steam locomotives of Austria
0-8-0T locomotives
Railway locomotives introduced in 1916
Standard gauge locomotives of Germany
Standard gauge locomotives of Poland
Standard gauge locomotives of Austria
Standard gauge locomotives of Austria-Hungary
Henschel locomotives
Scrapped locomotives
Freight locomotives